The 1982 ECAC Metro men's basketball tournament (now known as the Northeast Conference men's basketball tournament) was held March 5–7. The quarterfinal and semifinal rounds were played on campus sites with the championship game held at Schwartz Athletic Center in Brooklyn, New York. 

 defeated  in the championship game, 85–84, to win the first ECAC Metro men's basketball tournament. The Colonials earned the automatic bid to the 1982 NCAA tournament. This was the first NCAA tournament appearance for Robert Morris.

This was the first Tournament for the conference.

Bracket

Notes

References

1981–82 ECAC Metro men's basketball season
ECAC Metro men's basketball tournament
1980s in Brooklyn
Basketball competitions in New York City
College sports in New York City
Downtown Brooklyn
ECAC Metro men's basketball tournament
Northeast Conference men's basketball tournament
Sports in Brooklyn